Ronald Giere (1938 – 2020) was an American philosopher of science who was an emeritus professor of philosophy at the University of Minnesota. He was a Fellow of The AAAS, a long-time member of the editorial board of the journal Philosophy of Science, and a past president of the Philosophy of Science Association. His research focused on agent-based accounts of models and scientific representation, and on connections between naturalism and secularism.

Work
In his book Scientific Perspectivism he developed a version of perspectival realism in which he argued that scientific descriptions are somewhat like colours, in that they capture only selected aspects of reality, and those aspects are not bits of the world seen as they are in themselves, but bits of the world seen from a distinctive human perspective. In addition to the color example, Giere articulates his perspectivism by appeal to maps and to his own earlier and influential work on scientific models. Maps represent the world, but the representations they provide are conventional, affected by interest, and never fully accurate or complete. Similarly, scientific models are idealized structures that represent the world from particular and limited points of view. According to Giere, what goes for colors, maps, and models goes generally: science is perspectival through and through.

Publications
In addition to many papers in the philosophy of science, he was the author of the following books:
 Understanding Scientific Reasoning (1979; 5th edition, Thomson/Wadsworth, 2006)
 Explaining Science: A Cognitive Approach (University of Chicago Press, 1988)
 Science Without Laws (University of Chicago Press, 1999)
 Scientific Perspectivism (University of Chicago Press, 2006)

He also edited several volumes of papers in the philosophy of science, including, most recently, Cognitive Models of Science (University of Minnesota Press, 1992) and Origins of Logical Empiricism (University of Minnesota Press, 1996).

See also
Scientific structuralism

Notes and references

External links

 Subject's Homepage

1938 births
2020 deaths
20th-century American philosophers
21st-century American philosophers
Metaphysics of science
Philosophers of science
Philosophy academics
University of Minnesota faculty
People from Ohio